Upton County is a county located on the Edwards Plateau in the U.S. state of Texas. As of the 2020 census, its population was 3,308. Its county seat is Rankin. The county was created in 1887 and later organized in 1910. It is named for two brothers: John C. and William F. Upton, both colonels in the Confederate Army.

History

Native Americans

Native Americans were the first inhabitants of the area. Tribes present at the time of conquest included the Comanches and Apache.

Trails

One of the first routes bringing people through the area was the Chihuahua Trail connecting Mexico's state of Chihuahua with Santa Fe, New Mexico. The trail served as a trade route for nomadic tribes of Indians and Spaniards, as well as traders from both Mexico and Texas.

The Butterfield Overland Mail crossed the area from 1858 to 1861.

The Goodnight-Loving Trail served as a cattle-drive trail from 1866 to 1888. The trail began at Young County, Texas, and passed along the Pecos River to Fort Sumner, New Mexico,  and into Colorado before ending in Cheyenne, Wyoming.

Establishment of the county

Upton was formed in 1887 from Tom Green County, Texas. The county was named after John C. Upton and his brother William F. Upton. of Tennessee. Cattleman George Elliott became the first to establish a homestead in Upton County in 1880. Beginning as open range, the land was shared with sheepmen by the 1890s. The United States Census counted 52 people living in the county in 1890, and only 48 in 1900; most of these were either members of three families, or were in their employ. The agricultural sector of the county has been outpaced by cattle and sheep ranching. In 1982, about 92% of the land in Upton County was in farms and ranches, but less than 1% of the county was considered prime farmland, and only 2% of the county was cultivated. In the fall of 1911, the Kansas City, Mexico and Orient Railway reached the townsite of Rankin, and by January 1912, most of the people living in Upland had moved to Rankin.

Oil

Wildcatter George McCamey's Baker No. 1 in September 1925 opened up the McCamey Oil Field, established the town of McCamey and brought the subsequent oil boom to Upton County.  The Yates Oil Field in Crockett and Pecos Counties resulted in a financial boon for the town of Rankin, which served as a supply and service center.  The resulting financial windfall benefitted infrastructure in Rankin. In 1946, Mike Benedum began wildcatting in Upton County and  opened up what would become known as the Benedum Oil Field.   The Weir No. 1 gushed in 1961 and enabled Upton County to continue as an outstanding Texas production area.

Geography
The Spraberry Trend, the third-largest oil field in the United States by remaining reserves, underlies much of the county.

Major highways
  U.S. Highway 67
  U.S. Highway 385
  State Highway 329
  State Highway 349

Adjacent counties
 Midland County (north)
 Reagan County (east)
 Crockett County (south)
 Crane County (west)
 Ector County (northwest)

Demographics

Note: the US Census treats Hispanic/Latino as an ethnic category. This table excludes Latinos from the racial categories and assigns them to a separate category. Hispanics/Latinos can be of any race.

As of the census of 2000, 3,404 people, 1,256 households, and 934 families were residing in the county.  The population density was 3 people per square mile (1/km2).  The 1,609 housing units averaged 1 per square mile (0/km2).  The racial makeup of the county was 77.79% White, 1.62% African American, 1.20% Native American, 0.03% Asian, 0.06% Pacific Islander, 17.95% from other races, and 1.35% from two or more races.  About 42.57% of the population was Hispanic or Latino of any race.

Of the 1,256 households,  36.30% had children under the age of 18 living with them, 61.10% were married couples living together, 9.10% had a female householder with no husband present, and 25.60% were not families. Around 23.50% of all households were made up of individuals, and 12.20% had someone living alone who was 65 years of age or older.  The average household size was 2.68, and the average family size was 3.19.

In the county, the age distribution was 29.30% under 18, 7.90% from 18 to 24, 24.90% from 25 to 44, 23.80% from 45 to 64, and 14.20% who were 65 or older.  The median age was 38 years. For every 100 females there were 95.90 males.  For every 100 females age 18 and over, there were 93.30 males.

The median income for a household in the county was $28,977, and for a family was $37,083. Males had a median income of $30,729 versus $18,750 for females. The per capita income for the county was $14,274.  About 18.10% of families and 19.90% of the population were below the poverty line, including 26.60% of those under age 18 and 13.50% of those age 65 or over.

Communities

Cities
 McCamey
 Rankin (county seat)

Unincorporated community
 Midkiff

Ghost towns
 Upland

Politics

Education
Two school districts serve sections of the county:
 Grandfalls-Royalty Independent School District
 Monahans-Wickett-Pyote Independent School District
 Pecos-Barstow-Toyah Independent School District

All of the county is in the service area of Odessa College.

See also
 Recorded Texas Historic Landmarks in Upton County

References

External links
 http://genealogytrails.com/tex/bigbend/upton/
 Upton County government’s website
 
 Inventory of county records, Upton County courthouse, Rankin, Texas, hosted by the Portal to Texas History

 
1910 establishments in Texas
Populated places established in 1910
Majority-minority counties in Texas